Azikeyevo (Äzekäy) is a rural locality (a selo) and the administrative centre of Azikeyevsky Selsoviet, Beloretsky District, Bashkortostan, Russia. The population was 399 as of 2010. There are 15  streets.

Geography 
Azikeyevo is located 13 km southwest of Beloretsk (the district's administrative centre) by road. Buganak is the nearest rural locality.

References 

Rural localities in Beloretsky District